Commander John Wallace Linton,  (15 October 1905 – 23 March 1943) was a Royal Navy submariner and a Welsh recipient of the Victoria Cross, the highest award for gallantry in the face of the enemy that can be awarded to British and Commonwealth forces. Nicknamed "Tubby", he was a fine Rugby football forward, playing for the Royal Navy, United Services, and Hampshire County teams.

Naval career
Acting Sub-Lieutenant Linton was promoted to sub-lieutenant on 15 July 1926 and then lieutenant on 15 July 1928, with his seniority in rank subsequently adjusted. Found suitable for further promotion, he was promoted lieutenant commander on 1 July 1936.

In 1940 Linton was commander of the submarine Pandora operating in the Far East and in May 1940 brought her to Alexandria and on to Malta, where she was destroyed in the bombing attacks by the Luftwaffe on 1 April 1942.

Victoria Cross
Linton was 37 years old, and a commander in the Royal Navy during the Second World War, when the following deed took place for which he was awarded the Victoria Cross.

From the outbreak of the war in September 1939 to March 1943, which was the month of HMS Turbulents last patrol in the Mediterranean, Commander Linton was responsible for sinking over 90,000 tons of enemy shipping, including a cruiser, a destroyer, a U-boat and 28 other ships. In addition Turbulent destroyed three trains by gun fire. In his last year Commander Linton spent 254 days at sea, submerged for nearly half the time, his ship was hunted 13 times and had 250 depth charges aimed at her.

Turbulent had sunk a huge amount of enemy shipping and endured numerous attacks. The Royal Navy states that:

In recognition of this achievement, and the gallantry of Turbulent's crew, Linton was posthumously awarded the Victoria Cross on 25 May 1943. The citation read: 

Linton was killed in action in La Maddalena Harbour, Italy, on 23 March 1943.

Honours and awards
On 6 May 1941 Lieutenant-Commander John Wallace Linton of HMS Pandora was awarded the Distinguished Service Cross:

On 15 September 1942 Commander John Wallace Linton, DSC, was appointed a Companion of the Distinguished Service Order:

On 25 May 1943 Commander John Wallace Linton, DSO, DSC, was posthumously awarded the Victoria Cross for valour in command of HM Submarines:

The convoy attack specified in the citation occurred off Libya on 28/29 May 1942.

Legacy
Linton's body was not recovered and his name appears on the Portsmouth Naval Memorial, Portsmouth, Hampshire, England. Panel 72. Column 3. His Victoria Cross is on display in the Lord Ashcroft Gallery at the Imperial War Museum, London. A JD Wetherspoon's public house has been renamed in his honour in his hometown of Newport.

Linton was not the only member of his family to be lost aboard a Royal Navy submarine. His son, Sub-Lieutenant William F. Linton, was among the 75 men who perished when the A-class submarine  was lost in a training exercise on 16 April 1951.

See also
List of Welsh Victoria Cross recipients

References

External links
Commander J.W. Linton in The Art of War exhibition at the UK National Archives

1905 births
1943 deaths
People from Newport, Wales
Royal Navy submarine commanders
Royal Navy officers of World War II
Royal Navy personnel killed in World War II
Companions of the Distinguished Service Order
Royal Navy recipients of the Victoria Cross
Recipients of the Distinguished Service Cross (United Kingdom)
British World War II recipients of the Victoria Cross
Welsh recipients of the Victoria Cross